Edwin Richard Figueroa (born July 31, 1984) is an American mixed martial artist who most recently competed in the bantamweight division of the UFC. A professional MMA competitor since 2007, Figueroa fought in regional promotions in his home state of Texas before signing with Zuffa in 2011.

MMA career

Background
Figueroa started training in boxing at the age of 6, turned to kickboxing at 14, and turned professional mixed martial artist in 2007.

Ultimate Fighting Championship
Figueroa made his promotional debut against highly touted prospect Michael McDonald on March 26, 2011 at UFC Fight Night 24, replacing an injured Nick Pace on less than two weeks notice. The fight was highly entertaining with both fighters exchanging strikes and submission attempts throughout the entire fight and earned Fight of the Night honors. Figueroa lost the fight via unanimous decision (30-27, 30-27, 30-27).
 
Figueroa fought Jason Reinhardt on August 14, 2011 at UFC on Versus 5. He won the fight via TKO in the second round.

Figueroa next faced Alex Caceres on February 4, 2012 at UFC 143. He won the fight via split decision after Caceres was docked two points by referee Herb Dean in the second round for repeated illegal groin kicks.

Figueroa was expected to face Ken Stone on June 22, 2012 at UFC on FX 4. However, Figueroa was forced out of the bout with an injury and replaced by Francisco Rivera.

Figueroa next fought Francisco Rivera on February 2, 2013 at UFC 156. Figueroa was finished for the first time in his career when Rivera won via TKO late in the second round.

Figueroa faced Roland Delorme on June 15, 2013 at UFC 161. He lost the exciting back-and-forth fight via unanimous decision.

Figueroa next faced Érik Pérez at UFC 167. He lost the fight via unanimous decision and was subsequently released from promotion.

Figueroa returned to MMA after nearly three years off and faced Levi Mowles at LFC 56 at The Bomb Factory in Dallas on June 24, 2016.  He lost by unanimous decision.

Championships and accomplishments
Ultimate Fighting Championship
Fight of the Night (One time) vs. Michael McDonald

Mixed martial arts record

|-
| Loss
|align=center| 9–5
| Levi Mowles
| Decision (unanimous)
| LFC 56
| 
|align=center| 3
|align=center| 5:00
|Dallas, Texas, United States
|
|-
| Loss
|align=center| 9–4
| Érik Pérez
| Decision (unanimous)
| UFC 167
| 
|align=center| 3
|align=center| 5:00
|Las Vegas, Nevada, United States
|
|-
| Loss
|align=center| 9–3
| Roland Delorme
| Decision (unanimous)
| UFC 161
| 
|align=center| 3
|align=center| 5:00
|Winnipeg, Manitoba, Canada
|
|-
| Loss
|align=center| 9–2
| Francisco Rivera
| TKO (punches)
| UFC 156
| 
|align=center| 2
|align=center| 4:20
|Las Vegas, Nevada, United States
|
|-
| Win
|align=center| 9–1
| Alex Caceres
| Decision (split)
| UFC 143
| 
|align=center| 3
|align=center| 5:00
|Las Vegas, Nevada, United States
||
|-
| Win
|align=center| 8–1
| Jason Reinhardt
| TKO (elbows and punches)
| UFC Live: Hardy vs. Lytle
| 
|align=center| 2
|align=center| 0:50
|Milwaukee, Wisconsin, United States
|
|-
| Loss
|align=center| 7–1
| Michael McDonald
| Decision (unanimous)
| UFC Fight Night: Nogueira vs. Davis
| 
|align=center| 3
|align=center| 5:00
|Seattle, Washington, United States
| 
|-
| Win
|align=center| 7–0
| Johnny Bedford
| TKO (punches)
| KOK 9: Resurrection
| 
|align=center| 2
|align=center| 0:17
|Austin, Texas, United States
| 
|-
| Win
|align=center| 6–0
| Warren Stewart
| TKO (punches)
| SWC 11: Fury
| 
|align=center| 2
|align=center| 1:06
|Frisco, Texas, United States
| 
|-
| Win
|align=center| 5–0
| Navied Sadeghi
| Submission (choke)
| Art of War: Mano A Mano
| 
|align=center| 1
|align=center| 2:09
|Mesquite, Texas, United States
| 
|-
| Win
|align=center| 4–0
| Aaron Suarez
| KO (punch)
| KOK 5: Season's Beatings
| 
|align=center| 1
|align=center| 1:56
| Austin, Texas, United States
| 
|-
| Win
|align=center| 3–0
| Christian Sanchez
| TKO (punches)
| King of Kombat 4
| 
|align=center| 1
|align=center| 0:24
| Austin, Texas, United States
| 
|-
| Win
|align=center| 2–0
| Matt Yount
| TKO (punches)
| Xtreme Fighting Championships 9
| 
|align=center| 2
|align=center| 1:30
|Beaumont, Texas, United States
| 
|-
| Win
|align=center| 1–0
| Whitney Brown
| Submission (rear-naked choke)
| Art of War 2
| 
|align=center| 2
|align=center| 1:03
|Austin, Texas, United States
| 
|-

References

External links
Official UFC Profile

1984 births
American sportspeople of Salvadoran descent
American male mixed martial artists
Bantamweight mixed martial artists
Mixed martial artists utilizing Muay Thai
Mixed martial artists from Texas
American Muay Thai practitioners
Living people
Ultimate Fighting Championship male fighters